Peter Kennedy (born 1942/43) is an Australian political commentator and former journalist.

Early life
Kennedy's father was a public servant and worked part-time as a football and cricket writer for The Sunday Times. Kennedy attended Aquinas College from 1957.

Career
After leaving school, he worked in the library at The West Australian newspaper, but was unable to get a cadetship. He then studied at the University of Western Australia, where he graduated with a bachelor of arts (economics) and a diploma of education. Following that, he became a high school teacher, including at Bunbury Senior High School, and a lecturer in economics. He joined The West Australian as a journalist in 1970. In 1979, he joined The Sydney Morning Herald, first as its state political correspondent in Sydney and later as its chief of staff in the Canberra Press Gallery. In 1985, he became Press Secretary to Deputy Premier of Western Australia Mal Bryce, and some time after that, he worked for The West Australian again. In 1990, he joined the Australian Broadcasting Corporation, where he worked as a presenter for the Morning and Drive programs on ABC Radio Perth.

In 1995, Kennedy was awarded the Clarion Prize at the WA Media Awards. He became state political reporter for ABC News in 2000. In 2010 he retired from journalism, but continued as a political commentator, including writing for Business News. In 2011, he was appointed Adjunct Professor in Communications and Media at the University of Notre Dame Australia.

Books
Kennedy wrote Tales from Boom Town, a book about the premiers of Western Australia from David Brand to Colin Barnett. It was published in 2014 by UWA Press. An updated version was released in 2019, covering Mark McGowan as well.

References

Living people
1940s births

Year of birth uncertain
Australian political journalists
Australian political commentators
20th-century Australian journalists
21st-century Australian journalists
Journalists from Western Australia
Writers from Perth, Western Australia
People educated at Aquinas College, Perth